The 65th Pennsylvania House of Representatives District is located in northwest Pennsylvania and has been represented by Kathy Rapp since 2005.

District Profile 
The 65th District encompasses parts of Crawford County and all of Forest County and Warren County, and includes the following areas:

Crawford County

 Athens Township
 Bloomfield Township
Blooming Valley
Cambridge Springs
Cambridge Township
 Centerville
Cussewago Township
Richmond Township
Rockdale Township
Saegertown
 Spartansburg
 Sparta Township
Venango
Venango Township
Woodcock
Woodcock Township

Forest County

Warren County

Representatives

Recent election results

References

External links 

 District map from the United States Census Bureau
 Pennsylvania House Legislative District Maps from the Pennsylvania Redistricting Commission.
 Population Data for District 65 from the Pennsylvania Redistricting Commission.

Government of Crawford County, Pennsylvania
Government of Forest County, Pennsylvania
Government of Warren County, Pennsylvania
65